Princess Eugenie (Eugenie Victoria Helena; born 23 March 1990) is a member of the British royal family. She is the younger daughter of Prince Andrew, Duke of York, and Sarah, Duchess of York. She is a niece of King Charles III and a granddaughter of Queen Elizabeth II. At birth, she was 6th in the line of succession to the British throne and is now 11th. She is the younger sister of Princess Beatrice.

Born in Portland Hospital, London, Eugenie attended St George's School and Marlborough College before studying at Newcastle University, graduating with a bachelor's degree in English literature and history of art. She joined the auction house Paddle8 before taking a directing position at art gallery Hauser & Wirth. Eugenie also works privately with a number of charitable organisations, including Children in Crisis and Anti-Slavery International.

Eugenie married Jack Brooksbank, a brand ambassador, in 2018. Their son August was born in February 2021. In January 2023, they announced they were expecting their second child.

Early life
Eugenie was born by Caesarean section at Portland Hospital in the West End of London on 23 March 1990 at 7:58 pm, the second child of the Duke and Duchess of York, and sixth grandchild of Queen Elizabeth II and Prince Philip, Duke of Edinburgh. On 30 March, it was announced that the Duke and Duchess of York had named her Eugenie Victoria Helena.

She was baptised at St Mary Magdalene Church, Sandringham, by Peter Nott, Bishop of Norwich, on 23 December 1990. She was the first royal baby to have a public christening and the only one of the Queen's grandchildren not to be baptised in the Lily Font. 

Eugenie's parents divorced when she was six years old. The Duke and Duchess of York had agreed to joint custody of their two children. After the divorce, the Queen provided her parents with £1.4 million to set up a trust fund for her and Beatrice. Eugenie and her sister frequently travelled abroad with one or both of their parents.

In October 2002, the 12-year-old Eugenie underwent back surgery at the Royal National Orthopaedic Hospital in London to correct scoliosis; two  titanium rods were put in her back. After the operation the princess was not required to undergo any further spinal surgeries.

Education and career
Eugenie began her schooling at Winkfield Montessori from 1992 to 1993. From there, she joined her sister at Upton House School in Windsor until 1995. She attended Coworth Park School (now Coworth Flexlands School) from 1995 to 2001, and then St George's School, near Windsor Castle until 2003. For the next five years, Eugenie boarded at Marlborough College in Wiltshire. She achieved three A-Levels, including an 'A' in art, an 'A' in English literature, and a 'B' in history of art. She undertook a gap year before continuing her education in 2009.

Eugenie began studying at Newcastle University in September 2009. She graduated in 2012 with a 2:1 degree in English Literature and History of Art.

In 2013, she moved to New York City for one year to work for the online auction firm  Paddle8 as a benefit auctions manager. In July 2015, she moved back to London to work for the Hauser & Wirth art gallery as an associate director and was promoted to director in 2017.

Speaking on Channel 5 documentary Beatrice and Eugenie: Pampered Princesses, royal commentator Richard Kay claimed Eugenie enjoyed taxpayer funded security when she travelled the world during her gap year.

Marriage and family

The Duke of York's Office at Buckingham Palace announced the engagement of Eugenie and Jack Brooksbank on 22 January 2018. The couple had been dating for seven years, and were first introduced by friends in a ski break in Verbier, Switzerland, where Brooksbank was working. They were engaged on vacation in Nicaragua.  In April 2018, the couple moved from St James's Palace and took up residence in Ivy Cottage at Kensington Palace. The wedding took place at St George's Chapel, Windsor Castle, on 12 October 2018. The wedding dress was designed by the British fashion designer Peter Pilotto and Belgian Christopher de Vos of British-based label Peter Pilotto, and was designed to display her surgical scar. Eugenie chose to show her scar to honour those that helped her, and to inspire others with the condition of scoliosis.

Eugenie gave birth to a son, August Philip Hawke Brooksbank, on 9 February 2021 at the Portland Hospital in London, born by caesarean section due to her childhood scoliosis operation. At birth, he was eleventh in line to the throne. He is named after his great-grandfather Prince Philip, Duke of Edinburgh, and two of his five-times great-grandfathers: Reverend Edward Hawke Brooksbank, and Prince Albert, whose given names included "Augustus". August was christened at the Royal Chapel of All Saints, Windsor Park, on 21 November 2021, alongside his second cousin, Lucas Tindall.

From November 2020 to May 2022, the couple's main residence was Frogmore Cottage, which was leased to Eugenie's cousin Prince Harry. In May 2022, it was reported they had moved to Portugal, where Brooksbank works for Michael Meldman, and that they would once again stay at Ivy Cottage while in England. In January 2023, it was announced that Eugenie was pregnant with the couple's second child.

Activities

Eugenie receives no allowance from the Privy Purse. She does, however, undertake occasional public engagements, which are usually connected with the charities she supports, including the Teenage Cancer Trust and Children in Crisis. In 2018, Children in Crisis merged with Street Child, a children's charity active in multiple countries, with Eugenie still serving as an ambassador.

Eugenie and her sister represented their father at a service of thanksgiving for her aunt, Diana, Princess of Wales, in 2007. In 2008, she performed her first solo public engagement, opening a Teenage Cancer Trust's unit for young cancer patients in Leeds.

On 2 June 2011, Eugenie visited the Royal National Orthopaedic Hospital (RNOH) with her father as one of her first official engagements. In April 2012 she agreed to be patron for the hospital's Redevelopment Appeal, which was her first patronage. In 2014, Eugenie re-opened the children's unit at the RNOH. In 2014, she partnered with Daisy London Jewellery to create a limited edition charity bracelet to benefit the RNOH's Appeal. Eugenie became patron of the RNOH Charity in March 2019. In the same year she was named patron of Horatio's Garden, a charity that creates gardens for patients in NHS spinal injury centres.

In January 2013, Eugenie and her sister promoted Britain overseas in Germany. In 2016, Eugenie, along with her mother and sister, collaborated with British contemporary artist Teddy McDonald. The painting on canvas, titled Royal Love, was painted at Royal Lodge and exhibited in London prior to being sold with all proceeds from the sale of the painting donated by McDonald to the charity Children in Crisis. Eugenie and her sister became Patrons of the Teenage Cancer Trust in June 2016. She is also Patron of the Coronet Theatre, the European School of Osteopathy, the Tate Young Patrons and, alongside her mother, the Elephant Family, of which her uncle and aunt, the King and the Queen Consort, were joint presidents. In 2016, Eugenie visited a safe house run by The Salvation Army and met with victims of sexual abuse and modern slavery.

In 2017, Eugenie became the ambassador for the Artemis Council of the New Museum, a by-invitation membership initiative focused solely on supporting female artists. Eugenie also became an ambassador of Project 0 in 2018, a charity which in partnership with Sky Ocean Rescue, focuses on protecting the ocean from plastic pollution. In July 2018, in her capacity as co-founder and director of the Anti-Slavery Collective, Eugenie spoke at the NEXUS Global Summit at the UN headquarters in New York to discuss ending modern slavery. She and Julia de Boinville founded the collective in 2017 after a trip to Kolkata in 2012, where they first became familiar with the subject. In September 2018, she travelled to Serbia to visit ASTRA and ATINA, two grantees of the UN Trust Fund which fight against the issues of human trafficking and violence against women. In August 2019, it was announced that she would launch a podcast, the first member of the royal family to do so. Together with Julia de Boinville, co-founder of the Anti-Slavery Collective, they highlighted and discussed issues related to modern slavery. The first episode of the podcast, titled Floodlight, was released in April 2022. In July 2019, Princess Eugenie, with the help of the University of Hull's Wilberforce Institute, hosted an event  at Westminster Abbey to understand the scale of the plight of modern slavery. In October 2019, Eugenie became patron of Anti-Slavery International.

In May 2020, it was revealed that Eugenie and her husband were helping The Salvation Army with packing foods amidst the COVID-19 pandemic. In October 2020, Eugenie became patron of the Scoliosis Association UK. In June 2021, Princess Eugenie became an ambassador for the Blue Marine Foundation, and met with environmentalists at Somerset House. In October 2021, Princess Eugenie visited The Salvation Army's outreach hub as part of her work with the Anti-Slavery Collective. She took part in an art therapy class alongside modern slavery survivors. In June 2022, Eugenie launched the Ocean Advocate Series, which features conversations with ocean advocates and experts on how to preserve the seas and the environment.

On 17 September 2022, during the period of official mourning for Queen Elizabeth II, Eugenie joined her sister and six cousins to mount a 15-minute vigil around the coffin of the late Queen, as it lay in state at Westminster Hall. On 19 September, she joined other family members at the state funeral.

Titles, styles and arms

Titles and styles

As a male-line grandchild of the sovereign, Eugenie was known as "Her Royal Highness Princess Eugenie of York", with the territorial designation coming from her father's title, Duke of York. Since her marriage, she has been styled "Her Royal Highness Princess Eugenie, Mrs Jack Brooksbank" in the Court Circular.

Arms

Authored articles

Footnotes

References

External links

 
 

1990 births
Living people
20th-century English people
21st-century English people
20th-century English women
21st-century English women
Alumni of Newcastle University
British princesses
Brooksbank family
Daughters of British dukes
English Anglicans
English people of Danish descent
English people of German descent
English people of Greek descent
English people of Russian descent
English people of Scottish descent
House of Windsor
Mountbatten-Windsor family
People educated at Marlborough College
People educated at St George's School, Windsor Castle
People from Old Windsor
People from Sunninghill
People from Westminster
Prince Andrew, Duke of York